Palluel is a commune in the Pas-de-Calais department in the Hauts-de-France region of France.

Geography

History
The entire village was rebuilt after the ravages of World War I. 

On June 24, 1967, the commune was devastated by a narrow F5 tornado, killing 6 and injuring 30 others. 7 other villages were impacted. 17 homes were completely destroyed, vehicles picked up and thrown over homes and trees severely damaged. Although it reached 250 meters wide, it traveled 23 km. This is the most intense tornado to hit France since August 19, 1845 when an F5 tornado hit Montville, killing around 70.

Population

Places of interest
 The church, dating from the twentieth century.
 The lakes.

See also
Communes of the Pas-de-Calais department

References

Communes of Pas-de-Calais